Carlisle Companies Incorporated is an American diversified company that designs, manufactures, and markets a wide range of products that serve a broad range of niche markets to customers worldwide including commercial roofing, energy, agriculture, lawn and garden, mining and construction equipment, aerospace and electronics, dining and food delivery, and healthcare.

Early History 1917-1959
1917: Carlisle Tire and Rubber Company, the precursor to Carlisle Companies Incorporated, began operations on September 12, 1917. Charles S. Moomy, founder of Carlisle, had been working for his father at the Keystone Rubber Company in Erie, Pennsylvania. By 1917, Moomy had saved enough money to buy $4,000 in machinery and had an agreement from Montgomery Ward & Company to buy bicycle inner tubes. Moomy found a partner in James T. Johnstone, a New York rubber broker, who invested $30,000.
1926: Carlisle Tire and Rubber Company pioneered the country's first commercially extruded and fully molded inner tube. Within a few years, other tire companies were following Carlisle's technical lead.
1928: Carlisle was producing 10,000 inner tubes per day and outpacing its competition.
1929: Carlisle Tire and Rubber Company reached a record high employment level of 388 employees.

1930: The stock market crash in 1929 took its toll on American companies. By 1930, the price of natural rubber dropped to a low of 3 cents per pound and Montgomery Ward & Company stock fell by more than 50%. In an effort to save its customer base, Carlisle offered to pay half of Montgomery Ward's excise taxes on inner tubes. Despite this move, Carlisle's core business continued to decline along with its finances, forcing Charles Moomy to work with officials of Chase National Bank to settle Carlisle's debts and avoid bankruptcy.
1933: In accordance with the National Industrial Recovery Act of 1933, the Internal Revenue Service accepted write-offs of $452,938 for Carlisle's debt, allowing Moomy to narrowly forestall bankruptcy.
1934: However, by 1934, the Depression had worsened. The Federal Reserve Bank of Philadelphia and the Farmers Trust Company of Carlisle, Pennsylvania decided to loan Carlisle Tire and Rubber $250,000.

In addition, Carlisle's Assistant Treasurer, M.L. Dunkleberger, pledged his personal assets as collateral to meet weekly payrolls many times during this period.
 
In late 1943, faced with large wartime orders, Carlisle's competitor, Pharis Tire and Rubber Company of Newark, Ohio, was in dire need of additional production capacity. Furber Marshall, President of Pharis, negotiated with the Federal Reserve Bank and Farmers Trust Company for the purchase of Carlisle Tire and Rubber Company. The cost to Pharis was approximately $330,000. About this time, Pharis acquired the Molded Materials Company, a brake lining business in Ridgway, Pennsylvania, which would later become part of Carlisle Brake & Friction in 2008.
1946: George L. Ohrstrom Sr. founded G.L. Ohrstrom & Co. in the mid-1920s but changed the company's direction in 1946, focusing on the acquisition of small industrial companies using a leveraged buy-out or “boot-strap” model. The first acquisition that year was Peerless Manufacturing and the firm subsequently bought Ohio Pattern Works and Rotary Lift Company.
1947: G.L. Ohrstrom & Co. acquired a significant stake in Carlisle.
1949: As part of a liquidation of Pharis, all Carlisle stock was distributed to Pharis stockholders and the company name officially became Carlisle Corporation. That same year, Carlisle acquired the assets of the Dart Truck Company, a manufacturer of off-highway mining and construction trucks located in Kansas City, Missouri.

Carlisle ended the decade with $4 million in annual net sales.

1954: G.L. Ohrstrom & Co. merged Rotary Lift Company of Memphis, Tennessee into Carlisle Corporation and the firm became the controlling shareholder of Carlisle. Rotary Lift Company was later sold and became the present-day Dover Corporation with 2015 sales of $6.9 billion and traded under the symbol “DOV.”
1955: Under George L. Ohrstrom Sr.’s leadership, Carlisle transformed from a tire and rubber company to an enterprise focused on driving an entrepreneurial culture, an aggressive M&A strategy, a decentralized management model and a conservative capital philosophy at its core.
1959: Carlisle acquired Tensolite Insulated Wire Company Incorporated of Tarrytown, New York, which would become Carlisle Interconnect Technologies in 2008. The acquisitions during this decade enabled Carlisle to produce a broad range of new products, including molded radiator hoses, brake blocks and linings, high temperature conductors and insulated wire and cable.

By the end of the decade, Carlisle had net sales of $23 million with 550 employees and was on its way to becoming the modern Carlisle Companies.

History 1960-1999
1960: George L. Ohrstrom Sr. passed away and his son, George L. Ohrstrom Jr. began his relationship with Carlisle, refining and accelerating his father’s ideals. Carlisle listed its shares on the New York Stock Exchange using the ticker symbol “CSL” and sought to grow by focusing attention on acquisitions that produced highly specialized, technically advanced, high margin products that could be sold to industrial customers.

1961: Carlisle developed a synthetic rubber for roofing applications, which would later sell under the brand name Sure-Seal.

1962: Ohrstrom's acquisition strategy was working. By 1962 over 50% of net sales were generated by products not manufactured by Carlisle prior to 1958.

1967: Carlisle's stock split 2:1 for the first time since the IPO.

1962: Carlisle ended the decade with net sales of $83 million and 700 employees.

1972: Net sales in 1972 exceeded $100 million for the first time. Carlisle also opened its first international operations in Europe and launched a long-term corporate identification program, which placed increased emphasis on the ‘Carlisle’ name, yet allowed for division autonomy and identity.

1973: A recession began in the U.S. which lasted until 1975. All Carlisle businesses were affected during this period with net sales falling from $151 million in 1974 to $115 million in 1975, down 24%.

1977: Carlisle acquired Continental Plastics of Oklahoma City, Oklahoma, a maker of proprietary molded and vacuum-formed plastics for the commercial foodservice business. This acquisition formed the foundation of what would become Carlisle FoodService Products.

1978: Carlisle's synthetic rubber roofing product, Sure-Seal, rapidly grew in sales from 1978 and quickly became one of the company's most important products. By the late 1970s, the roofing business had become the biggest contributor to Carlisle's earnings.

1979: Carlisle finished the decade with $324 million in net sales with EBIT margin of 11%. Despite the recession in the mid-1970s, Carlisle's sales grew at a 15% CAGR through the decade. Capital expenditures in 1979 were also a record $24 million, a large percentage of which was spent on expansion of capacity to produce Sure- Seal roofing systems.

1980: Carlisle's stock jumped from a high of $29 in 1979 to $86 in 1980 as Carlisle's Sure-Seal rubber roofing products grew in popularity.

1982: Despite a recession in 1982 driving net sales lower 7%, by 1983, Carlisle had recovered to a record $412 million of net sales.

1986: Carlisle Corporation was restructured into a holding company with the name Carlisle Companies Incorporated.

1987: The stock market crash on October 19, 1987, did not significantly affect Carlisle's 1987 net sales, which ended at a record $543 million.

1989: By the end of the decade, homeownership in the United States had risen to 65% from 55% two decades before. American suburban expansion drove the need for shopping malls, schools and other related non-residential buildings, all requiring single-ply membrane roofs. As a result, Carlisle's roofing business grew from $77 million at the start of 1980 to $175 million in net sales by the end of the decade.

Carlisle finished 1989 with $553 million in net sales with EBIT margin of 8%.

1990: In addition to focusing on three core segments, Carlisle continued to pursue M&A, leading to the completion of 30 acquisitions during the decade. Carlisle Executive Leadership laid out a plan to grow the business to $1 billion by 1994 with a new emphasis on international sales.

1992: In order to focus on the core manufacturing platform of rubber, plastics and friction, Carlisle sold the businesses comprising the Data Communications and Electronics group.

1993: Carlisle's stock split 2:1 in both 1993 and 1997 for the 4th and 5th times in its history.

1994: Carlisle acquired a tire plant in Shenzen, China, the company's first factory in China and second in Asia. Over the next two years, capacity was doubled.

1996: Carlisle eclipsed $1 billion in net sales.

1999: Net sales grew to $1.6 billion with EBIT margin of 10% by the end of the decade, an 11% CAGR.

History 2000-Today

2001: Marked 25 consecutive years of increasing dividend payments for shareholders.

2003: Carlisle surpassed net sales of $2 billion with EBIT margin of 7%.

2007: Carlisle's stock split 2:1 for the 6th time in its history.

2008: The Carlisle Operating System (COS), based on Lean and Six Sigma principles, was launched, combining people, process, technology and innovation in a collaborative effort to improve performance and drive profitability.

Carlisle's ‘pillar’ strategy was developed to drive operating excellence and focus investment in the company's core businesses: Carlisle Construction Materials (CCM), Carlisle Interconnect Technologies (CIT), Carlisle Brake & Friction (CBF), Carlisle FoodService Products (CFS) and Carlisle Transportation Products (CTP).

2009: By the end of the decade, net sales reached $3 billion with EBIT margin of 6%. Carlisle employed over 10,000 employees worldwide.

2015: Carlisle continued to focus on acquisitions to drive growth. In 2015 Carlisle invested in a new platform, acquiring Finishing Brands Holdings Inc. for $590 million funded all in cash. This business would become a pillar, Carlisle Fluid Technologies (CFT).

2016: Annual net sales reached $3.7 billion with over 13,000 employees worldwide. Since 2008, Carlisle had doubled sales, increased EBIT margin by over 600 basis points, invested over $700 million in capital expenditures and accumulated over $150 million in savings from COS.

In this same eight-year period, Carlisle deployed over $2.4 billion acquiring 15 businesses. These acquisitions proved transformative for the company.

Carlisle also celebrated 40 consecutive years of dividend increases for shareholders.

The Board of Directors voted to move the corporate headquarters to Scottsdale, Arizona.

September 12, 2017 marked the 100 year anniversary of Carlisle Companies Incorporated.

In October 2017, Carlisle acquired Accella Performance Materials, a premium specialty polyurethane company, and the largest acquisition in Carlisle's history. 
 
2018: In early 2018, Carlisle launched Vision 2025, the cornerstone of the company's next one hundred years. In Vision 2025, Carlisle seeks to drive above-market organic growth, build scale in core businesses by pursuing synergistic acquisitions, further leverage the COS culture to drive efficiencies through all business processes, continue to return cash to shareholders, and invest in attracting, developing, and retaining exceptional talent.

Divestures

Carlisle Food Service (CFS) - February 2018

Carlisle Brake & Friction (CBF) - August 2021

See also 
 List of S&P 400 companies
 List of tire companies

References

External links
Official website

Companies listed on the New York Stock Exchange
Companies based in Charlotte, North Carolina
Manufacturing companies of the United States
Manufacturing companies established in 1917
1917 establishments in Pennsylvania
Tire manufacturers of the United States
1960s initial public offerings